Before You Is the Sea is a short film by the Palestinian visual artist and filmmaker Hisham Zreiq (Zrake). The film deals with the relationship between a young Palestinian man and a young Israeli Jewish woman 
The film is an allegory of the Middle East peace process, and the collapse of Oslo Accords during the Camp David summit, effectively ending years of peace hopes.
The film was screened in many film festivals.

Awards and festivals
Before you is the sea was a Finalist in MADE in MED short film contest and was screened in many film festivals and events as:
 Chicago Palestine Film Festival - Chicago, USA(2012) 
 An adventure through films and visual arts by Hisham Zreiq - Rijswijk, Netherlands (2013) 
 III MUESTRA DE CINE PALESTINO DE MADRID film festival - Madrid, Spain (2012)  
 Tweede Palestijnse Filmdag Hilversum - Hilversum, Netherlands (2013)

See also
 The Sons of Eilaboun
 List of Palestinian films

References

External links
 
 
 Before you is the sea at Israel Film Center

German drama short films
Israeli short films
Palestinian short films
2010s Hebrew-language films
2010s Arabic-language films
2011 films
2011 multilingual films
German multilingual films
Israeli multilingual films